American Society for Theatre Research (ASTR) is a non-profit organization established in 1956. It publishes the journal Theatre Survey. It is a member of the American Council of Learned Societies.

References

Theatrical organizations in the United States
1956 establishments in the United States
Organizations established in 1956